Among those who were born in the London Borough of Sutton, or have dwelt within the borders of the modern borough are (alphabetical order):

 Martin Adams, BDO Darts World Champion, born in Sutton
 Harry Aikines-Aryeetey, world-class sprinter, attended Greenshaw High School
 George Anson, 1st Baron Anson, admiral, owned Carshalton House
 Joan Armatrading, singer-songwriter and  musician, lived in Sutton in the 1970s
 Tony Barton, Aston Villa's 1982 European Cup winning manager, from Sutton
 David Bellamy, broadcaster and botanist, attended Sutton Grammar School
 Sally Anne Bowman, up-and-coming model, was murdered in Croydon, South London
 Sir Francis Carew, grandson of Sir Nicholas Carew; of Beddington Park; Elizabethan horticulturalist
 Sir Nicholas Carew, sheriff of Surrey and Sussex, Master of the King's Horse, executed by Henry VIII
 Jeff Beck, born and raised in Wallington
 Noël Coward, actor and playwright, lived in Lenham Road, Sutton until the age of six
 Quentin Crisp, writer and gay icon
 Clark Datchler, lead singer of Johnny Hates Jazz
 Sir John Fellows, 1st Baronet, owned Carshalton House (now St Philomena's Girls' School) and built the adjacent Water Tower and perhaps the 'Hermitage' in the garden
 David Fletcher, former Surrey cricketer 
 Elizabeth Glover, who introduced the printing press to New England, was married to the Reverend Joseph Glover, Rector of Sutton
 Bradley McIntosh, member of former chart topping band S Club 7, attended Greenshaw High School
 Katie Melua, award-winning singer, songwriter and musician, lived on Gander Green lane and attended Nonsuch High School for girls
 Brian Paddick, British Liberal Democrat politician, attended Sutton Grammar School for Boys
 Mike Parry, author, journalist, radio host and controversialist
 Sidney Richard Percy, painter, lived in Mulgrave Road, Sutton
 John Radcliffe, physician and benefactor to the University of Oxford, owned Carshalton House
 Michael Reeves, writer and director of horror classic Witchfinder General
The Rolling Stones were discovered at the then Red Lion pub (now the Winning Post) in Sutton; the pub was also where Charlie Watts and Bill Wyman became permanent members of The Rolling Stones, on 23 January 1963. 
 Joanna Rowsell, world championship gold medal cyclist
Sir Harry Secombe, humourist, singer, comedian, entertainer and member of the Goon Show cast; local resident and personality; the Secombe Theatre in Sutton is named after him
 Melanie South, British tennis player, attended Nonsuch High School for girls
 Neil Sullivan, Sutton-born Scottish international goalkeeper
 Graham Sutherland, painter, etcher and designer, attended Homefield Preparatory School, Sutton
 William Talbot, 1st Earl Talbot, peer and politician, is buried in Sutton churchyard
 Barry Tebb, poet, novelist, editor, translator, founder of Sixties Press; mental health campaigner
 Sarah Tullamore, actress and singer
 Philip Yorke, 1st Earl of Hardwicke, Lord High Chancellor, owned Carshalton House

References

Sutton